Head of the Redeemer is a 33×22 cm oil on panel painting of the head of Christ by Giovanni Bellini, dating to 1500–1502 and now in the Gallerie dell'Accademia in Venice. It is a fragment of a larger scene of the Transfiguration; another fragment from the same work bears a scroll with the signature IOANNES BELLINUS ME PINXIT ("Giovanni Bellini painted me").

References

1502 paintings
Paintings by Giovanni Bellini
Paintings in the Gallerie dell'Accademia